The Quartier de La Chapelle is a neighborhood of Paris, in the eastern part of the 18th arrondissement.  It was originally the village of La Chapelle on the outskirts of Paris and a commune in its own right, separated from the commune of Paris by the wall of the Farmers-General.  However, as part of the city's major 19th-century expansion, the former village was absorbed by Paris in 1860.

References 

18th arrondissement of Paris
La Chapelle